The TCA Ground, or Tasmanian Cricket Association Ground, is one of two first-class standard cricket grounds in Hobart, Tasmania. It is located on the Queens Domain less than one kilometre from the CBD.

The TCA Ground is a picturesque ground with a village feel and white picket boundary which could easily belong in the English countryside, except for the typical Australian Eucalypt bushland which hugs the boundary line. Due to its elevated position on the Domain the ground has commanding views over the River Derwent and city, as well as being dominated by views of Mount Wellington. This elevated position also exposes the ground to strong sea breezes which can provide excellent assistance for bowlers.  
During a match between the touring South African team and a Combined XI in December 1963, South African captain Trevor Goddard appealed to the umpires about the strength of the wind, which led to play being suspended.

The ground is regularly used for local Grade competition cricket in the summer, and Australian rules football in the winter. It has both synthetic and grass nets, and an indoor bowling practice area.

The other first-class standard ground in Tasmania is the now preferred Bellerive Oval in the City of Clarence which has since the late 1970s overtaken the TCA Ground as the home of the Tasmanian cricket team and the TCA, and the ground which hosts Australia's international matches when they play in Hobart. No first-class cricket has been played at the TCA Ground since 1987.
 
It currently hosts Hobart Football Club (SFL) and DOSA Football Club (Old Scholars FA) Australian Rules football matches each Winter and North Hobart Cricket Club matches in TCA cricket each Summer.

History
Cricket had been played at the venue as far back as the early 1870s and on 8 September 1873 the TCA were granted permission to use the ground for cricket only, the TCA's annual reports state that the TCA Ground was opened in 1882 following approximately 10 years of intermittent development. 
The main grandstand, the H.C Smith Stand was completed in 1880, and extended in 1908, but has otherwise remained unchanged since that time. It is now heritage listed. 
The small stand next to it is known as the Ladies Stand, and was completed in 1894. For much of the early 20th century, crowds were segregated by gender. 
The Ladies Stand was originally in the opposite pocket to where it currently stands, (where the kiosk and DOSA Football Clubrooms currently stand) but was blown over by a gale in 1946, it was again blown down in 1995 and was rebuilt in late 1999.

The ground was opened with much fanfare in 1882, with the TCA played a visiting Melbourne Cricket Club (MCC) XI, and although the scorecard is lost, the TCA was soundly trounced.

One of the early problems the ground faced was the drought which struck southern Tasmania towards the end of the 19th century. 
The pitch cut up and was virtually unplayable. On one occasion Edward H. Butler, a Tasmanian fast-bowler who also played for the Marylebone Cricket Club, took advantage of the conditions take 6 for 1 for Southern Tasmania against Northern Tasmanian, the pitch soon developed a feared reputation among batsmen. 
The ground long suffered from lack of water supply often with bare patches, until after the First World War when mains supply reached it.

Another problem which dogged the ground in the early years was inadequate seating and changing room facilities. 
The original Member's Stand of 1880 was moved back in 1906 to allow the construction of a more modern brick addition which opened in 1908, and was to be later named the H.C Smith Stand after longtime Tasmanian cricket official Horace Clyde Smith (1893–1977).

A "classic" style scoreboard was added in 1907 (later demolished in 1984 after years of neglect), complete with a press area underneath. 
A top deck with outside stairs was added in 1946, and by 1950 there was a players viewing area. 
By 1977 the press area had been modernised and relocated to the top deck of the H.C Smith Stand, but by this stage, Bellerive Oval was already being considered instead of further improvements to the TCA Ground.

The smaller stand next to the H.C Smith Stand was unnamed and was built by the Hobart Greyhound Racing Club (HGRC) and was opened in September 1954 (demolished in April 2018) as was the concrete grandstand now known as the Powell Pascoe Payne Stand, named for Hobart Football Club legends, also opened in September 1954, along with new entrance gates, turnstile houses and ticket boxes.

The roofed section at the southern end of the ground between the stands which shielded punters from the often inhospitable weather was built in 1951 and survived for many years through damaging winds and vandalism until it was removed by the Hobart City Council in late 2010 due to its asbestos content.

The TCA Ground's golden era was from 1979, when a near record crowd of 10,882 for a sporting match turned up on 4 January 1979 to see Tasmania win its first domestic cricket trophy, the then Gillette Cup, until 1985 when 6,500 turned up to watch the mighty West Indies defeat Sri Lanka in the grounds only One-Day International.
The ground record is 11,002 in a Tasmania v Australian XI match on 5 March 1948.

By 1999 the ground had fallen into a terrible state of disrepair, and a National Trust restoration plan was unveiled. It was proposed to restore the ground as a Federation style village ground, and unemployed "work for the dole" labour was used with a combined grant with the Federal Government and the Hobart City Council to repair it. 
The stands were re-painted with typical period colours, and modern ad-boards were removed.

With a small population and player base, the TCA and Tasmanian representative teams have often had to deal with small crowds and inferior quality teams, and for much of the 20th century, struggled to gain acceptance into the Sheffield Shield. By the time they were finally accepted into the Sheffield Shield in 1977, the TCA had moved base across the river to Bellerive Oval, and so the TCA ground has only seen 12 matches in that competition, when it has been required as an alternative venue.

Prior to that Tasmania had played 87 first-class games at the ground, primarily against Victoria and touring international sides.
Tasmania has also played 12 domestic one-day games at the TCA ground, including the 1979 Gillette Cup final, when they were victorious for the first time playing against Western Australia.

The last state-level cricket match held at the TCA Ground was on 15 March 1987 when Tasmania faced South Australia in the nationally televised 1986-87 McDonalds Cup final, South Australia recording an 86-run victory to take the title before a crowd of more than 8,000 spectators, signalling the end of an era for Tasmanian cricket.

Other sports and events at the TCA Ground
The TCA ground has primarily been used throughout its 141-year history for cricket and Australian football. 
However, many other sports have been played there. 
When the ground first opened in 1882, there was also two tennis courts, which were later moved to the Domain Tennis Centre. There was also a skittles alley, and the wooden building on the eastern side of the ground built in 1911 which still exists was the TCA bowls club. 
Cycling events have been held there, and in the 1890s winter afternoons were given over to baseball matches, and quoits was often played there in that period.

One of the more unusual sights the TCA Ground has experienced was in 1902 when two Japanese warships arrived in Hobart. 
A "Japanese Sports Day" was declared and a large crowd attended to witness competition in Japanese martial arts, kendo (described as "single stick exercises"), and sumo wrestling.

The most common alternate use for the TCA ground has been Australian Rules Football. 
The ground hosted numerous TFL Grand Finals and State Grand Finals up until 1921. 
It hosted a number of neutral fixtures in TANFL football until Hobart Football Club moved into the ground in 1945 and began playing home matches there in 1946 until the club and the TANFL fell into a dispute with the TCA and HGRC over high rent costs at the venue and subsequently Hobart Football Club moved its home fixtures to North Hobart Oval from 1954 to 1960, ultimately returning to the ground from 1961 and playing there each winter until 1982, when, as part of the TANFL's ground rationalisation plans, the Tigers were forced to play their home fixtures at grounds with better facilities. 
After a tumultuous era from 1983 to 1997 which saw them play at both North Hobart Oval and KGV Oval the club dropped out of the TFL Statewide League in 1997 and joined the SFL the following year, returning to their spiritual home, the TCA Ground.

The most recent non-sporting event at the TCA Ground was a rock concert held by Australian rock legends AC/DC as part of their "Stiff Upper Lip" national tour which saw the ground filled with its largest ever crowd of 15,300 on 27 January 2001.

Hobart Greyhound Racing Club
From 1935 to 1980 greyhound racing meetings were held at the ground. Visible remnants of that era include the dog kennelling quarters at the north of the ground (now home to the Hobart City Band), and a covered standing book-makers area which was removed in 2010 due to asbestos. 
The Hobart Greyhound Racing Club (HGRC) used its considerable resources to build two grandstands at the TCA Ground which were both opened in September 1954 and the above-mentioned bookmakers area in 1951, at a time when the TCA were in considerable financial hardship. The first meeting at the ground was held on 30 January 1935. The principal event was the Hobart Cup (later the Hobart Thousand). When the HGRC left the ground in October 1980 they moved to the Royal Hobart Showground.

TCA Ground upgrades
Following a lengthy application process in March 2010 the Hobart City Council aldermen voted to reject an application for 25-metre floodlights suitable for night football and cricket matches.
Only two out of the nine aldermen present voted in favour of the application, with those against concerned about heritage, light spill, the effects on Glebe residents and visibility from as far as Knocklofty Reserve.
Following on from this rejection, a new application was submitted by the ground's tenant the Hobart Football Club.
This application was approved in May 2011, and the lights were installed.
Hobart hosted five night matches in their stint in the Tasmanian State League until their return to SFL football in 2014 and hosted their first match on returning to the SFL under lights but have only hosted two Under-18 matches at night since then.
Works got underway following the close of the 2017 football season in order to completely resurface the playing field and to level it out. 
The small unnamed stand beside the H.C Smith Stand, erected by the Hobart Greyhound Racing Club in 1954, was demolished in April 2018.
This is the first phase in a $5 million redevelopment of the ground over the next few years. 
In the coming years it is proposed to demolish the kiosk and bar area, the Hobart Football Club changerooms and build new multi-purpose buildings in their place with considerably more works also planned. 
A new electronic video screen scoreboard was installed by Solid Scoreboards in April 2018 at a cost of $122,000, replacing the manual scoreboard which was built by the City of Hobart in 2001.

First-class and "A" matches at the TCA Ground
One-Day Internationals (ODI): (1) 
West Indies defeated Sri Lanka by 8 wickets 10 January 1985

Domestic one-day: (12) 
Tasmania:             played: 12, won: 5, lost: 7
Queensland:           played: 4, won: 2, lost: 2
South Australia:     played: 3, Won: 2, lost: 1
New South Wales: played: 2, won: 1, lost: 1
Western Australia:    played: 2, won: 1, lost: 1
Victoria:        played: 1, won: 1

First-class: (87) (12 Sheffield Shield matches)
Tasmanian Tigers: played: 87, won:8 (1), lost: 37 (5), drawn: 32 (5), abandoned:1
Victorian Bushrangers: played: 22 (2), won: 12 (1), lost: 6 (1), drawn: 4
Marylebone Cricket Club: played: 13, won: 5, lost: 8, drawn: 0
New South Wales Blues: played: 9 (3), won: 7 (2), lost: 1, drawn: 1 (1)
West Indian cricket team: played: 6, won: 2, lost: 0, drawn: 4
An Australian XI: played: 6, won: 3, lost: 0, drawn: 3
Indian cricket team: played: 4, won: 1, lost: 1, drawn: 2, abandoned:1
England cricket team: played: 3, won: 2, lost: 0, drawn: 1
South African cricket team: played: 3, won: 1, lost: 0, drawn: 2
Southern Redbacks: played: 3 (2), won: 2 (1), lost: 0, drawn: 1 (1)
Western Warriors: played: 3 (2), won: 0, lost: 0, drawn: 3 (2)
Pakistan cricket team: played: 2, won: 2, lost: 0, drawn: 0
Queensland Bulls: played: 2 (2), won: 1 (1), lost: 0, drawn: 1 (1)
New Zealand cricket team: played: 1, won: 0, lost: 0, drawn: 1
World XI: played: 1, won: 0, lost: 0, drawn: 1

NB: Figures within brackets denote Sheffield Shield matches.

References

External links
Cricinfo
Hobart City Council
Tasmanian Cricket Association

Music venues in Australia
Sports venues in Hobart
Cricket grounds in Australia
Australian rules football grounds
Sports venues completed in 1882
Cricket in Tasmania
Defunct greyhound racing venues in Australia